The Rock Bottom Remainders, also known as the Remainders, was an American rock charity supergroup, consisting of published writers, most of them both amateur musicians and popular English-language book, magazine, and newspaper authors. The band took its self-mocking name from the publishing term "remaindered book", a work of which the unsold remainder of the publisher's stock of copies is sold at a reduced price. Their performances collectively raised $2 million for charity from their concerts.

Band members included Dave Barry, Stephen King, Amy Tan, Sam Barry, Ridley Pearson, Scott Turow, Joel Selvin, James McBride, Mitch Albom, Roy Blount Jr., Barbara Kingsolver, Robert Fulghum, Matt Groening, Tad Bartimus, Greg Iles, Aron Ralston and honorary member Maya Angelou among others, as well as professional musicians such as multi-instrumentalist (and author) Al Kooper, drummer Josh Kelly, guitarist Roger McGuinn and saxophonist Erasmo Paulo. Founder Kathi Kamen Goldmark died on May 24, 2012, and the group disbanded a month later, following a memorial concert in her honor.

History
The Remainders was founded by Kathi Kamen Goldmark in 1992. Goldmark was then a musician whose day job was in book publicity. Through this, she met many prolific authors. One day while driving one of the authors around, she hit upon the idea of starting a band with them. It stuck. The Remainders' first performance was in 1992 at the American Booksellers Association convention in Anaheim, California. A review of the concert in The Washington Post referred to it as "the most heavily promoted musical debut since The Monkees."

In his memoir On Writing, Stephen King described the Remainders' performances as energetic if sloppy due to the limited music skill of himself and some other writers, and perhaps reminiscent of a bar band when augmented by a few professional musicians.: '...with a couple of “ringer” musicians on sax and drums (plus, in the early days, our musical guru, Al Kooper, at the heart of the group), we sounded pretty good. You’d pay to hear us. Not a lot, not U2 or E Street Band prices, but maybe what the oldtimers call “roadhouse money."' Dave Barry later joked "We played music by what I call the Rumor Method, wherein from time to time an alarming rumor went around the band: There might have been a chord change. This prompted everybody to change to a new chord. Although not necessarily the same new chord."

The Remainders also played at the opening of the Rock and Roll Hall of Fame in Cleveland, Ohio, in 1995.

In April 2010, they began the Wordstock Tour presented by the Pearson Foundation and We Give Books, benefiting the children and schools of Haiti.

The Remainders gave their last concert on June 23, 2012, at the annual conference of the American Library Association in Anaheim, where they played their first concert 20 years before. The event, co-sponsored by ProQuest, raised money for library and information science scholarships.

The Remainders last performed together on the August 6, 2012, episode of The Late Late Show with Craig Ferguson, on which both Stephen King and Dave Barry were guests (although the segment was taped in June 2012 when the band was in town for the ALA concert).

In September 2014, it was announced that the Remainders would reunite to perform at the  Tucson Festival of Books in March 2015. On March 15, 2015, the band's reunion was referenced in Merl Reagle's syndicated Sunday crossword puzzle. Titled "Book Notes," the crossword included the band's name and several puns using names of writers who were members.

Concerts
1992, Anaheim: American Booksellers Association convention
1993, Various cities: The 'Three Chords and an Attitude' tour - 6 dates on the US East Coast
1995, Cleveland: The Rock and Roll Hall of Fame (opening)
A version of the band with Barry and Albom and Ridley Pearson and Warren Zevon also played at the Miami Book Fair in 1997
2012, Anaheim: American Library Association convention
2002, Miami: Outside American Airlines Arena before Bruce Springsteen & the E Street Band‘s concert during The Rising tour

Guests

Lesley Gore
Tony Kornheiser
Roger McGuinn
Bruce Springsteen
Warren Zevon
Darlene Love
Nestor Torres
Frank McCourt
Richard Belzer
Garry Marshall
Frank Pagano

Daniel Handler
Carl Hiaasen
Douglas Adams
Andy Borowitz
Alan Cheuse
Roy Peter Clark
Margit Detweiler
Tim Dorsey
Tananarive Due
Julia Glass
James W. Hall
Darrell Hammond
Vicki Hendricks
Michelle Kaufman
Greil Marcus
Les Standiford
Gene Weingarten
Jennifer Weiner
Alan Zweibel
Craig Ferguson

Songs covered

"Werewolves of London" by Warren Zevon
"Chain of Fools" – Amy Tan lead vocals
"Runaway" by Del Shannon
"Gloria" by Them
"If the House is a Rockin'..."
"In the Midnight Hour" (The Rock Bottom Remainders performed this song during an appearance on The Late Late Show with Craig Ferguson. Host Craig Ferguson himself the best-selling author of Between the Bridge and the River played the drums. Just before the performance, he joked that "the only reason [he] wanted to write a book was so that he could play with this band." Dave Barry was also the first guest on the show.)
"Louie Louie" (Matt Groening claims he uses the "explicit" interpretation of the lyrics and Dave Barry claimed that it was so filthy that the U.S. Constitution should be amended to prohibit it.)
"Rockaway Beach"
"Stand By Me" Ben E. King version
"These Boots Are Made for Walkin'" Amy Tan lead vocal 
"Wild Thing" (In one broadcast of Wait Wait... Don't Tell Me!, Barry revealed this song as a band inside joke, since Roy Blount Jr., always mistimes his single vocal line: "You move me.")
"You Ain't Goin' Nowhere"
"You Can't Judge a Book by Its Cover" by Bo Diddley
"You May Be Right"
"Surfin' Bird"
"Leader of the Pack"  Performed in Denver for Mayor (at the time) John Hickenlooper
"Dock of the Bay", with Barbara Kingsolver as lead vocalist

Discography
Several RBR members are featured on the double album Stranger than Fiction ("Don't Quit Your Day Job" Records), along with other noted authors' comic attempts at song.

Books
Dave Barry, Tad Bartimus, Roy Blount Jr., Michael Dorris, Robert Fulghum, Kathi Goldmark, Matt Groening, Stephen King, Barbara Kingsolver, Al Kooper, Greil Marcus, Dave Marsh, Ridley Pearson, Joel Selvin and Amy Tan, Mid-Life Confidential: The Rock Bottom Remainders Tour America with Three Chords and an Attitude, 1994, with photographs by Tabitha King.

Mitch Albom, Dave Barry, Sam Barry, Roy Blount Jr., Matt Groening, Greg Iles, Stephen King, James McBride, Roger McGuinn, Ridley Pearson, Amy Tan, and Scott Turow, Hard Listening: The Greatest Rock Band Ever (Of Authors) Tells All, 2013. The interactive ebook combines essays, fiction, musings, candid email exchanges and conversations, compromising photographs, audio and video clips, and interactive quizzes to give readers a view into the private lives of the authors.

See also
Band from TV, a similar group featuring television actors

References

External links

1992 establishments in California
2012 disestablishments in California
Charity supergroups
Rock music groups from California
Musical groups disestablished in 2012
Musical groups established in 1992
Stephen King
Amy Tan
Musical groups from California
Musicians from Anaheim, California